The 1932 All-Ireland Senior Football Championship was the 46th staging of Ireland's premier Gaelic football knock-out competition. Kerry were the winners for the fourth year in a row.

Results

Connacht Senior Football Championship

Leinster Senior Football Championship

Munster Senior Football Championship

Ulster Senior Football Championship

All-Ireland Senior Football Championship

Championship statistics

Miscellaneous

 Kerry equals Wexford (1915- 1918) by being All Ireland champions for the 4th year in a row.

References

All-Ireland Senior Football Championship